UTC−03:30 is an identifier for a time offset from UTC of −03:30.
It is used in the Canadian province of Newfoundland and Labrador as Newfoundland Time Zone.

As standard time (Northern Hemisphere winter)
Principal city: St. John's

North America
Canada – Newfoundland Time Zone
Newfoundland and Labrador
Labrador
The area between L'Anse-au-Clair and Norman Bay
Newfoundland

Historical use
It was also used in Uruguay as standard time between 1924-04-01 and 1942-03-14, with DST being a half-hour offset with clocks set to UTC−03:00, and in Suriname between 1945-10-01 and 1984-10-01.

References

UTC offsets
Time in Canada

es:Huso horario#UTC−03:30, P†